Iván Andrés Escudero Ordoñez (born 11 January 2001) is an Ecuadorian weightlifter. He won the silver medal in the men's 81kg event at the 2022 South American Games held in Asunción, Paraguay. He is also a two-time silver medalist at the 2022 Bolivarian Games held in Valledupar, Colombia.

He won the gold medal in the men's 81kg event at the 2021 Junior Pan American Games held in Colombia. He competed in the men's 81kg event at the 2022 World Weightlifting Championships in Bogotá, Colombia.

Achievements

References

External links 
 

Living people
2001 births
Place of birth missing (living people)
Ecuadorian male weightlifters
South American Games silver medalists for Ecuador
South American Games medalists in weightlifting
Competitors at the 2022 South American Games
21st-century Ecuadorian people